The 1954–55 Allsvenskan was the 21st season of the top division of Swedish handball. 10 teams competed in the league. IK Heim won the league and claimed their second Swedish title. Redbergslids IK and Skövde AIK were relegated.

League table

References 

Swedish handball competitions